Sabine Hack was the defending champion but did not compete that year.

Linda Wild won the final on a walkover against Yayuk Basuki.

Seeds
A champion seed is indicated in bold text while text in italics indicates the round in which that seed was eliminated.

  Sabine Appelmans (quarterfinals)
  Shi-Ting Wang (first round)
  Yayuk Basuki (final)
  Marianne Werdel-Witmeyer (second round)
  Linda Wild (champion)
  Karin Kschwendt (second round)
  Laurence Courtois (semifinals)
  Ann Grossman (second round)

Draw

References
 1996 Danamon Open draw

Danamon Open
1996 WTA Tour